Cristian Hernán Tissone (born 8 February 1988) is an Argentine professional footballer who plays for Portuguese club Mirandela as a centre-back.

In the summer of 2015, Tissone signed for Portuguese side Vitória de Setúbal on a two-year contract.

He is the younger brother of Málaga CF player Fernando Tissone.

Tissone holds an Italian passport, and is also eligible for Cape Verdean citizenship due to his grandfather.

References

External links

1988 births
Living people
People from Quilmes
Afro-Argentine sportspeople
Argentine people of Italian descent
Sportspeople of Italian descent
Argentine people of Cape Verdean descent
Sportspeople of Cape Verdean descent
Argentine footballers
Association football defenders
Serie D players
S.S.D. Pro Sesto players
Divisiones Regionales de Fútbol players
RCD Mallorca B players
Tercera División players
UE Olot players
FC Honka players
Atlético Malagueño players
Vitória F.C. players
Anadia F.C. players
Argentine expatriate footballers
Argentine expatriate sportspeople in Italy
Argentine expatriate sportspeople in Spain
Argentine expatriate sportspeople in Portugal
Expatriate footballers in Italy
Expatriate footballers in Spain
Expatriate footballers in Finland
Expatriate footballers in Portugal
Sportspeople from Buenos Aires Province